Frank Furedi (born 3 May 1947) is a Hungarian-Canadian academic and emeritus professor of sociology at the University of Kent. He is well known for his work on sociology of fear, education, therapy culture, paranoid parenting and sociology of knowledge.

Early life and education
Furedi's family emigrated from Hungary to Canada after the failed 1956 uprising, and he did his bachelor's degree in international relations at McGill University in Montreal. He has lived in Britain since 1969, most recently in Faversham. He completed his MA in African politics at the School of Oriental and African Studies, and received his PhD from the University of Kent in 1987 with a thesis on the Mau Mau Uprising in Kenya. 

He is married to Ann Furedi.

RCP and offshoots
A former student radical, he became involved in left-wing politics in Britain in the 1970s; in particular, as a member of the International Socialists (IS), under the pseudonym Frank Richards. With his followers, he was expelled from the IS in 1973 and formed the Revolutionary Communist Group, and then broke from that in 1976 to form the Revolutionary Communist Tendency, refounded as the Revolutionary Communist Party in 1978.

The RCP was distinguished by its contrarianism, commitment to theoretical elaboration and hostility to state intervention in social life. Among its positions were support for the IRA and Saddam Hussein.

In December 1990, the RCP's magazine Living Marxism ran an article by Furedi, entitled "Midnight in the Century", which argued that the corrosive effect of the collapse of both Stalinism and reformism on the working class meant that "for the time being at least, the working class has no political existence". This signalled a re-orientation of the party towards more libertarian positions, and its formal dissolution by the end of the decade.

Furedi now is associated with the RCP's successor, the web site Spiked Online.

Academic career
Furedi's academic work was initially devoted to a study of imperialism and race relations. His books on the subject include The Mau Mau War in Perspective, The New Ideology of Imperialism and The Silent War: Imperialism and the Changing Perception of Race. In recent years his work has been oriented towards exploring the sociology of risk and low expectations. Furedi is author of several books on this topic, most recently Wasted: Why Education Isn't Educating (Continuum 2009) and Invitation to Terror: The Expanding Empire of the Unknown (Continuum 2007), an analysis of the impact of terrorism post 9/11. His more recent publications, On Tolerance: A Defence of Moral Independence (Continuum 2011) and Authority: A Sociological Introduction (Cambridge University Press) deal with the inter-related problem of freedom and authority. 

He was, according to research from 2005, the most widely cited sociologist in the UK press. Furedi frequently appears in the media, expressing his view that Western societies have become obsessed with risk. He writes regularly for Spiked. He has also written several books on the subject of risk, offering a counterpoint to the analyses of Anthony Giddens and Ulrich Beck, including Paranoid Parenting, Therapy Culture, and Culture of Fear.

Notable PhD students he has supervised include Munira Mirza.

In November 2021, Furedi assumed the post of director of the MCC Brussels centre, an offshoot of the Mathias Corvinus Collegium funded by the ruling Hungarians Fidesz party, citing the need for an alternative to mainstream pro-European think-thanks.

Views
In the 1990s he was actively involved in humanist-focused issues, especially campaigns for free speech. Furedi maintains that society and universities are undergoing a politically driven 'dumbing down' process which is manifest in society's growing inability to understand and assess the meaning of risk. The rise of the environmental and green movements parallels society's growing obsession with risk. Furedi also attacks the scientific consensus on global warming, and has criticised the prominent role played by science in policy formation.

In 2008 he criticised opponents of American vice presidential candidate Sarah Palin on the Spiked website. He claims: "It seems that even fervent advocates of women’s rights will adopt outdated and chauvinistic moral rhetoric when targeting a woman they do not like."

In 2008 he co-authored a book with Jennie Bristow published by the think tank Civitas titled Licensed to Hug: How Child Protection Policies Are Poisoning the Relationship Between the Generations and Damaging the Voluntary Sector, arguing that the growth of police vetting (see Criminal Records Bureau) has created a sense of mistrust and advocating a more common-sense approach to adult/child relations, based on the assumption that the vast majority of adults can be relied on to help and support children, and that the healthy interaction between generations enriches children's lives.

Reception
Critics of Furedi are drawn from a wide spectrum of left and progressive opinion who criticise as cultish and reactionary the organizations in which he has been a leading figure. Furedi's views on race have been described as a "colourblind racism". George Monbiot has elicited an admission from the managing editor of Spiked Online that they have received $300,000 in funding from the Charles Koch Foundation, a fact not declared on their website. He has accused Furedi of overseeing extreme right-wing libertarian campaigns "against gun control, against banning tobacco advertising and child pornography, and in favour of global warming, human cloning and freedom for corporations". Monbiot also accuses him of leading entryism of ex-RCPers into "key roles in the formal infrastructure of public communication used by the science and medical establishment", to pursue an agenda in favour of genetic engineering. The journalist Nick Cohen has described the RCP as a "weird cult" whose Leninist discipline, disruptive behaviour and selfish publicity-seeking have remained unaltered during the various tactical shifts in the face it presents to the wider world.

In reviewing Furedi's Where Have All the Intellectuals Gone? for The Times in 2004, the traditional conservative philosopher and writer Roger Scruton said:

The philosopher Mary Warnock suggested in 2011 that he is "to be respected in the strongest sense, indeed greatly admired" for his exposure of hypocrisy and intolerance in contemporary culture.

Bibliography
The Soviet Union Demystified: A Materialist Analysis, Junius Publications, 1986, 
The Mau Mau War in Perspective, James Currey Publishers, 1989
Mythical Past, Elusive Future: History and Society in an Anxious Age, Pluto Press, 1991
The New Ideology of Imperialism: Renewing the Moral Imperative, Pluto Press, 1994
Colonial Wars and the Politics of Third World Nationalism, IB Tauris, 1994
Culture of Fear: Risk Taking and the Morality of Low Expectation, Continuum International Publishing Group, 1997, . 2nd edition: 2002, 
Population and Development: A Critical Introduction, Palgrave Macmillan, 1997
The Silent War: Imperialism and the Changing Perception of Race, Pluto Press, 1998
Courting Mistrust: The Hidden Growth of a Culture of Litigation in Britain, Centre for Policy Studies, 1999
Paranoid Parenting: Abandon Your Anxieties and Be a Good Parent, Allen Lane, 2001
Therapy Culture: Cultivating Vulnerability in an Uncertain Age, Routledge, 2003
Where Have All the Intellectuals Gone?: Confronting Twenty-First Century Philistinism, Continuum International Publishing Group, 2004
The Politics of Fear. Beyond Left and Right, Continuum International Publishing Group, 2005, 
Invitation to Terror: The Expanding Empire of the Unknown, Continuum International Publishing Group, 2007, 
 Licensed to Hug: How Child Protection Policies Are Poisoning the Relationship Between the Generations and Damaging the Voluntary Sector with Jennie Bristow, Civitas, 2008, . 2nd Revised edition: 2010, 
Wasted: Why Education Isn't Educating, Continuum International Publishing Group, 2009
On Tolerance: The Life Style Wars: A Defence of Moral Independence, Continuum International Publishing Group, 2011, 
Authority: A Sociological Introduction, Cambridge University Press, 2013
Moral Crusades in an Age of Mistrust: The Jimmy Savile Scandal, Palgrave Macmillan, 2013, 
First World War: Still No End in Sight, Bloomsbury USA, 2014, 
Power of Reading: From Socrates to Twitter, Bloomsbury, 2015, 
Populism and the European Culture Wars: The Conflict of Values between Hungary and the EU, Routledge, 2017, 
How Fear Works: Culture of Fear in the Twenty-First Century, Bloomsbury, 2018, 
Why Borders Matter: Why Humanity Must Relearn the Art of Drawing Boundaries, Routledge, 2020, 
100 Years of Identity Crisis: Culture War Over Socialisation, de Gruyter, 2021,

References

Further reading

External links

1947 births
Academics of the University of Kent
Alumni of SOAS University of London
British humanists
British political party founders
British political writers
British sociologists
British Trotskyists
Canadian emigrants to England
Hungarian emigrants to Canada
Hungarian emigrants to England
Hungarian political writers
Hungarian sociologists
Living people
McGill University alumni
Revolutionary Communist Party (UK, 1978) members